HD 157662 is a bright giant star in the southern constellation of Ara. It has a magnitude 10.91 companion at an angular separation of 76.4″ along a position angle of 159°.

References

External links
 HR 6478
 Image HD 157662
 CCDM J17272-5038

Ara (constellation)
157662
Double stars
B-type bright giants
6478
085409
Durchmusterung objects